Sayyed Majid (also Romanized as Seyyed Majīd; also known as ‘Ashīreh-ye Seyyed Majīd) is a village in Tarrah Rural District, Hamidiyeh District, Ahvaz County, Khuzestan Province, Iran. At the 2006 census, its population was 20, in 4 families.

References 

Populated places in Ahvaz County